The Commonwealth of the Northern Mariana Islands has a self-governing government consisting of a locally elected governor, lieutenant governor and the Northern Mariana Islands Commonwealth Legislature. 

The current lieutenant governor is David M. Apatang, since January 9, 2023.

List of lieutenant governors of the Northern Mariana Islands

References

External links
Commonwealth of the Northern Mariana Islands Executive Branch

 
Lieutenant governor